is a passenger railway station located in the city of Himeji, Hyōgo Prefecture, Japan, operated by the private Sanyo Electric Railway.

Lines

Station layout
The station consists of one ground-level bay platform.

Platforms

Adjacent stations

|-
!colspan=5|Sanyo Electric Railway

History
Sanyo-Aboshi Station opened on July 6, 1941 as  approximately 100 meters to the west of its present site. It was relocated and a new station building constructed in December 1990, and was renamed on April 7, 1991 .

Passenger statistics
In fiscal 2018, the station was used by an average of 2390 passengers daily (boarding passengers only).

Surrounding area
 Marugame Domain Aboshi Jin'ya Ruins
Usukihachiman Shrine
Daikakuji Temple

See also
List of railway stations in Japan

References

External links

 Official website (Sanyo Electric Railway) 

Railway stations in Japan opened in 1941
Railway stations in Himeji